Crossroads Moment is the third album by American singer-songwriter Jimi Jamison released in Europe on July 11, 2008 for Frontiers Records. The album was produced by Jim Peterik, distributed in Germany by Soulfood Music and released in the United States in 2009. The big accomplish of the album is that was voted #3 album of the year in Europe. The sound of the album mixes Jamison's classic AOR voice with the Peterik sound established since his days in Survivor. There is one music video of the single "When Rock Was King" and two Europe and Japanese bonus tracks, "Alive" and "Streets of Heaven".

Track listing

Personnel 

 Jimi Jamison - lead vocals
 Ed Breckenfeld - drums
 Klem Hayes - bass
 Mike Aquino - guitar
 Jim Peterik - guitar, keyboards, backing vocals
 Joel Hokstra - guitar 
 Christian Cullen - keyboards 
 Jeff Lanz - keyboards 
 Thom Griffin - backing vocals
Lisa McClowry - backing vocals

References 

2008 albums
Jimi Jamison albums